Go Ahead Eagles are a Dutch professional football club from the city of Deventer. They play in the Eredivisie, the top tier of Dutch football, having achieved promotion from the second tier Eerste Divisie in the 2020-21 season. The club's home stadium since 1920 is De Adelaarshorst. The club have won the national championship on four occasions, in 1917, 1922, 1930 and 1933.

They have produced numerous notable players including Raimond van der Gouw, René Eijkelkamp, Marc Overmars, Paul Bosvelt, Jan Kromkamp, Victor Sikora, Bert van Marwijk and Demy de Zeeuw while providing Henk ten Cate, Erik ten Hag and Leo Beenhakker with their first tastes of management.

History

Early successes
The club was founded in 1902 as Be Quick by the Hollander brothers. The name was soon changed to Go Ahead at the request of the Dutch Football Association in 1905. 

Go Ahead started in the second-tier Tweede Klasse. In 1911, the club reached promotion to the Eastern Eerste Klasse. In 1916, Go Ahead became champions of the Eastern Eerste Klasse for the first time, after which they faced off for the national championship in a competition with the other regional champions. In this championship playoffs for the national championship, however, the southern champions from Willem II proved too strong. A year later, however, Go Ahead took their first league title, a feat repeated in 1922, 1930 and 1933.

In the period betweeen the First and Second World War, Go Ahead was by far the most successful team in the Eastern league. The club won the regional championship fifteen times during that period, and even won the title eight times in a row from 1916 to 1923.
The last pre-war Eastern Championship was won in 1937. After that, the club fell on tough times. In 1941, Go Ahead suffered relegation to the Tweede Klasse. The following year, they promoted again. In 1948, the club became champion of the Eastern First Division for the sixteenth and final time. In the playoffs for the national championship with the other regional champions, Go Ahead finished third behind eventual champions, BVV Den Bosch, and Heerenveen.

Professionalism and Europe
The introduction of professionalism in 1954 was initially unsuccessful for Go Ahead. In 1956, the club finished second to last in the Tweede Divisie. In 1959, promotion to the Eerste Divisie was secured. On 7 October 1962, Go Ahead recorded their biggest win in club history. In Deventer the final score was 11–1 against Roda JC. Promotion to the top-tier Eredivisie followed in 1963. In the twenty-four years that followed, the club continuously played at the highest level. Especially in the second half of the sixties, Go Ahead did well in the Eredivisie. For example, from 1966 to 1969, the club finished in the top five four times in a row, with the 1967–68 season as high point when Go Ahead finished third behind Ajax and Feijenoord.

Go Ahead also had successes in the KNVB Cup in that period. The club reached the semi-finals four times in a row from 1965 to 1968. Those of 1966, 1967 and 1968 were lost, but in 1965, Go Ahead reached the final. This was lost 1–0 to Feijenoord, but because Feijenoord was also national champion, Go Ahead qualified for European football. In the first round, Scottish side Celtic, who would eventually go on to win the European Cup a season later, was drawn. Go Ahead lost the two legs, 0–1 and 6–0.

On 1 July 1971, the suffix "Eagles" was added, following a suggestion from then head coach Barry Hughes, as the professional department of Go Ahead separated from the parent club. The eagle is the charge in the coat of arms of the city of Deventer. The club had a strong start with their new name. Go Ahead Eagles were famously the only side to defeat Ajax in any competition during the 1971–72 season when they won 3–2 at De Adelaarshorst in the Eredivisie. 

In the 1970s and early 1980s, Go Ahead Eagles was a stable Eredivisie club. Relegation followed in 1987. A short Eredivisie period followed from 1992 to 1996, but afterwards the club played in the second-tier Eerste Divisie. Partly due to the constant postponement of the construction of a new stadium, major financial concerns arose. Thanks to the help of investors, the club managed to survive in November 2003. In exchange for that help, the investors acquired 80% of the club's shares. The club is thus privately owned. The determining factor was former chairman Hans de Vroome, who owned approximately 50% of the shares.

In May 2019, Alex Kroes took over 80% of the shares of Go Ahead Eagles, becoming the new owner.

Recent seasons
After almost two decades in the Eerste Divisie, Go Ahead won promotion to the 2013–14 Eredivisie at the end of the 2012–13 season, winning the promotion play-offs. The club remained in the top division for the 2014–15 season, finishing 13th. 

Go Ahead Eagles would compete in Europe in the 2015–16 UEFA Europa League due to the Netherlands' first place in UEFA Respect Fair Play ranking. National Fair Play winner Twente withdrew due to financial difficulties, making the place for Go Ahead Eagles. However, they also suffered relegation after losing 2–0 on aggregate to De Graafschap in the May 2015 promotion/relegation play-offs. In July 2015, they were beaten 2–5 on aggregate by Hungarian side Ferencváros in the first Europa League qualifying round with the home leg played in Emmen due to the Adelaarshorst being renovated, and the away leg without spectators because the Hungarians were serving a ban by UEFA.

The club bounced back to the Eredivisie on the first attempt in May 2016 after beating De Graafschap 5–2 on aggregate in the promotion/relegation play-offs, but were relegated again at the end of the 2016–17 season.

In May 2021, Go Ahead finished second in the Eerste Divisie, earning promotion back to the Eredivisie after four seasons in the second tier.

Honours
 Eredivisie
 Winner: 1916–17, 1921–22, 1929–30, 1932–33

 KNVB Cup
 Runners-up: 1964–65

 Tweede Divisie
 Winner: 1958–59

 Promoted to Eredivisie
 Promotion: 1962–63, 1991–92, 2012–13, 2015–16, 2020–21

Domestic results

Below is a table with Go Ahead Eagles' domestic results since the introduction of professional football in 1956.

European record

Notes
Goals by Go Ahead Eagles are listed first.
1R: First round
GS: Group stage

Rivalries

Go Ahead Eagles' biggest rivals are PEC Zwolle. Both clubs are located at the river IJssel, hence the name IJssel-derby. Further teams who share a rivalry with Go Ahead Eagles include FC Twente, Vitesse and De Graafschap.

Current squad

Out on loan

Former players

  Stephan Andersen
  Kari Arkivuo
  Peter Arntz
  Kresten Bjerre
  Sonny Bosz
  Henk ten Cate
  Wiel Coerver
  René Eijkelkamp
  Reza Ghoochannejhad
  La'Vere Corbin-Ong
  Leo Halle
  Cees van Kooten
  Jan Kromkamp
  Bert van Marwijk
  Marc Overmars
  Quincy Promes
  Dick Schneider
  Viktor Sikora
  Uğur Yıldırım
  Hamid Zarbaf
  Demy de Zeeuw

Coaching staff

Coaching history

 Fred Fitton (1946–1948)
 Stephan Nagy (1948–50)
 Franz Köhler (1954–56)
 Gilbert Richmond (1957–62)
 František Fadrhonc (July 1, 1962 – June 30, 1970)
 Barry Hughes (July 1, 1970 – June 30, 1973)
 Jan Notermans (1973–75)
 Henk van Brussel (1975)
 Leo Beenhakker (1975–76)
 Henk van Brussel (interim) (1976)
 Wiel Coerver (July 1, 1976 – June 30, 1977)
 Henk van Brussel (interim) (1978)
 Joop Brand (July 1, 1978 – Feb 17, 1980)
 Spitz Kohn (July 1, 1980 – June 30, 1981)
 Bob Maaskant (1981–83)
 Henk Wullems (July 1, 1983 – June 30, 1986)
 Nico van Zoghel (July 1, 1985 – June 30, 1988)
 Mircea Petescu (June 30, 1988 – December 15, 1988)
 Fritz Korbach (December 15, 1988 – June 30, 1990)
 Henk ten Cate (Feb 22, 1990 – June 30, 1990)
 Jan Versleijen (July 1, 1990 – June 30, 1993)
 Henk ten Cate (July 1, 1993 – Jan 27, 1995)
 Ab Fafié (Jan 27, 1995 – June 30, 1996)
 Leo van Veen (July 1, 1996 – June 30, 1997)
 Jan van Staa (July 1, 1997 – June 30, 2002)
 Theo de Jong (2001–02)
 Robert Maaskant (July 1, 2002 – Feb 2, 2003)
 Raymond Libregts (Jan 15, 2003 – June 30, 2005)
 Mike Snoei (July 1, 2005 – March 4, 2008)
 Gerard Somer (interim) (March 4, 2008 – March 7, 2008)
 Andries Ulderink (March 7, 2008 – June 30, 2011)
 Joop Gall (July 1, 2011 – March 24, 2012)
 Michel Boerebach (int.) (March 24, 2012 – March 31, 2012)
 Jimmy Calderwood (March 30, 2012 – June 30, 2012)
 Erik ten Hag (July 1, 2012 – June 30, 2013)
 Foeke Booy (July 1, 2013 – March 22, 2015)
 Dennis Demmers (March 22, 2015 – Feb 1, 2016)
 Harry Decheiver (interim) (2016)
 Hans de Koning (Feb 20, 2016 – Mar 22, 2017)
 Robert Maaskant (Mar 25, 2017 – Jun 30, 2017)
 Leon Vlemmings (Jul 1, 2017 – Dec 3, 2017)
 Jan van Staa (Dec 5, 2017 – Jun 30, 2018)
 John Stegeman (Jul 1, 2018 – May 29, 2019)
 Jack de Gier (May, 2019 – Jun 30, 2020)
 Kees van Wonderen (Jul 1, 2020 – present)

See also
 Eerste Divisie
 List of football clubs in the Netherlands

References

External links

Official website 
Club profile  at Weltfussballarchiv
Online fanzine 
Bozen van het Oosten 

 
Association football clubs established in 1902
1902 establishments in the Netherlands
Football clubs in the Netherlands
Football clubs in Deventer